The icterine greenbul (Phyllastrephus icterinus) is a species of songbird in the bulbul family, Pycnonotidae. It is found in western and central Africa.

Taxonomy and systematics
The icterine greenbul was originally described in the genus Trichophorus (a synonym for Criniger). The term icterine refers to its yellowish colouration. Formerly, some authorities have considered Sassi's greenbul to be a subspecies of the icterine greenbul. Alternate names for the icterine greenbul include the lesser icterine bulbul and lesser icterine greenbul.

Liberian greenbul 
Until 2018, a rare colour morph of the icterine greenbul from the Cavalla forest in south-eastern Liberia was believed to be a separate species. The Liberian greenbul (Phyllastrephus leucolepis) was known from only a few sightings between 1981 and 1984, and a specimen collected in 1984. This specimen is now considered to have been a plumage aberration. A 2017 DNA analysis revealed that the bird(s) were common icterine greenbuls, albeit with unusual plumage colouring, which may have been caused by a nutritional deficiency. Alternative names for the Liberian greenbul included the spot-winged bulbul, spot-winged greenbul and white-winged greenbul.

Distribution and habitat
The icterine greenbul is found in Africa from Guinea to Ghana; southern Nigeria to western and southern Uganda, eastern and central Democratic Republic of the Congo and extreme north-western Angola. Its natural habitats are subtropical or tropical dry forests, subtropical or tropical moist lowland forests, and moist savanna.

References

Further reading

External links
Image at ADW

Phyllastrephus
Greenbuls
Birds of Central Africa
Birds of West Africa
Birds described in 1850
Taxa named by Charles Lucien Bonaparte
Taxonomy articles created by Polbot